The 1971–72 Scottish Inter-District Championship was a rugby union competition for Scotland's district teams.

This season saw the 19th Scottish Inter-District Championship.

Edinburgh District won the competition after defeating Glasgow District in a play-off.

1971-72 League Table

Results

Round 1

Edinburgh District: 

South:

Round 2

North and Midlands:

Glasgow District:

Round 3

Glasgow District:

South:

Round 4

Glasgow District: 

Edinburgh District: 

South: 

North and Midlands:

Round 5

North and Midlands: 

Edinburgh District:

Play-off

Edinburgh District: 

Glasgow District:

Matches outwith the Championship

Other Scottish matches

Trial matches

Blues Trial: 

Whites Trial:

English matches

International matches

References

1971–72 in Scottish rugby union
Scottish Inter-District Championship seasons